The 1939-1940 SM-sarja season did not take place because of the Winter War, which made playing ice hockey impossible.

Liiga seasons
Fin
1939–40 in Finnish ice hockey
Cancelled ice hockey competitions